Jasmine Records is a London-based record label that specialises in jazz reissues.

History 
The label was founded in 1982 as part of Hasmick Promotions, issuing LPs and cassettes of jazz and popular vocalists. Jasmine diversified into country music in 1985. In 1990, the label released its first compact disc.

References 

1982 establishments in the United Kingdom
Jazz record labels
British jazz record labels
Reissue record labels